Tilloy-lez-Marchiennes (literally Tilloy near Marchiennes) is a commune in the Nord department in the Hauts-de-France region in Northern France. In 2018, it had a population of 516.

History

In March 2020, Marie Cau won a majority of votes in the first round of the mayoral election (with the entire municipal council also being members of her electoral list) on a platform of developing social and environmental policies like sustainable agriculture. Her inauguration was delayed until May due to the COVID-19 pandemic. Her election as the first known openly transgender mayor in France garnered international media coverage.

Heraldry

See also
Communes of the Nord department

References

Tilloylezmarchiennes
French Flanders